Johann Wenzel Anton Stamitz (Czech: Jan Václav Antonín Stamic; 18 June 1717 – 27 March 1757) was a Bohemian composer and violinist. His two surviving sons, Carl and Anton Stamitz, were composers of the Mannheim school, of which Johann is considered the founding father. His music is stylistically transitional between Baroque and Classical periods.

Life
Stamitz was born in Deutschbrod, Bohemia, into a family that came from Marburg (today Maribor, Slovenia).

Stamitz spent the academic year 1734–1735 at the University of Prague. After only one year, he left the university to pursue a career as a violin virtuoso. His activities during the six-year period between his departure from the university in 1735 and his appointment in Mannheim around 1741 are not precisely known.

He was appointed by the Mannheim court in 1741 or 1742. Most likely, his engagement there resulted from contacts made during the Bohemian campaign and coronation of Carl Albert (Karl VII) of Bavaria, a close ally of the Elector Palatine. In January 1742, Stamitz performed before the Mannheim court as part of the festivities surrounding the marriage of Karl Theodor, who succeeded his uncle Karl Philipp as Elector Palatine less than a year later; Carl Albert was among the wedding guests.

Stamitz married Maria Antonia Luneborn on July 1, 1744. They had five children together, Carl Philipp, Maria Franziska, Anton Thadäus Nepomuk, and two children who died in infancy.

Probably around the late summer of 1754, Stamitz paid a yearlong visit to Paris, perhaps at the invitation of music patron Alexandre Le Riche de La Poupelinière with whom he stayed, appearing in public there for the first time at a Concert Spirituel on September 8, 1754. His Parisian success induced him to publish his Orchestral Trios, Op. 1 (actually symphonies for string orchestra), and possibly other works of his by various publishers there.

He probably returned to Mannheim around the autumn of 1755, dying there in spring 1757, less than two years later, at the age of 39. The entry of his death reads: "March 30, 1757. Buried, Jo'es Stainmiz, director of court music, so expert in his art that his equal will hardly be found. Rite provided".

Compositions 

Stamitz's most important compositions are his 58 symphonies and his 10 orchestral trios. The orchestral trios are actually symphonies for strings, but may be played one player to a part as chamber music. His concertos include numerous ones for violin, two for viola, two for harpsichord, 12 for flute, one for oboe, one for trumpet, and one for clarinet, among the earliest concertos for the instrument (Johann Melchior Molter's six from the 1740s seem to have been the first). He also composed a large amount of chamber music for various instrumental combinations, as well as eight vocal works including his widely circulated concert Mass in D.

Because at least five other 18th-century musicians bore the surname Stamitz, including four from Johann's immediate family, any attempt to catalog his (or any of the others') works is risky at best, principally in view of the many variations in spelling. Actually, few difficulties arise in distinguishing between works by Johann Stamitz and those of his sons Carl and Anton. By contrast, the relationship of the names 'Steinmetz' and 'Stamitz' has caused substantial confusion, given at least two other 18th-century musicians with the surname Steinmetz.

Innovations in the Classical symphony

Johann Stamitz's expanded orchestration included important wind parts. His symphonies of the 1750s are scored in eight parts: four strings, two horns and two oboes, although flutes or clarinets may substitute for the oboes. Horns provided not only a harmonic backdrop for strings but solo lines as well, and he was also one of the first composers to write independent lines for oboes.

The chief innovation in Stamitz's symphonic works is their four-movement structure: fast – slow – minuet and trio – dashing presto or prestissimo finale. While prior isolated four-movement symphonies exist, Stamitz was the first composer to use it consistently: well over half his symphonies and nine of his ten orchestral trios are in four movements. He also contributed to the development of sonata form, most often used in symphonic first movements but occasionally in finales (when not in rondo form) and even slow movements (when not in ABA ternary form) as well.

Stamitz also adapted and extended traits originally developed in Italian opera in his instrumental works. He added innovative dynamic devices such as extended crescendos, simple tutti chordal textures and slow harmonic rhythm. Like Italian operas, Stamitz's compositions have a strong sense of rhythmic drive and distinctive thematic material.

Selected works
 Trios, Op. 1
 Symphony in G major "Mannheim No. 1"
 Symphony in A major "Mannheim No. 2"
 Symphony in B-flat major "Mannheim No. 3"
 Symphony in D major, Op. 3, No. 2
 Symphony in E-flat major, Op. 11, No. 3
 Symphony in F major
 Missa Solemnis in D major
 Litaniae Lauretanae in C major
 Violin Concerto in C major
 Violin Concerto in B-flat major
 Clarinet Concerto in B Flat Major
 Flute Concerto in C major
 Flute Concerto in D major
 Flute Concerto in G major
 Notturno in D major

References 

Johann Stamitz
Biography and works for viola d'amore
"Johann (Wenzel Anton) [Jan Waczlaw (Václav) Antonin (Antonín)] Stamitz", Grove Music Online ed. L. Macy
Wolf, Eugene K. The Symphonies of Johann Stamitz: A Study in the Formation of the Classic Style. Bohn, Scheltema & Holkema 1981 
Wright, Craig; Bryan Simms. Music in Western Civilization: Volume B – The Baroque and Classical Eras, Thompson Schirmer 2006

External links

Musicians from Havlíčkův Brod
People from the Kingdom of Bohemia
1717 births
1757 deaths
18th-century Bohemian musicians
Czech Classical-period composers
Czech male classical composers
Czech expatriates in Germany
Czech people of Slovene descent
18th-century classical composers
18th-century male musicians